West Worcestershire is a constituency in Worcestershire represented in the House of Commons of the UK Parliament since 2010 by Harriett Baldwin, a Conservative. The constituency is considered a safe seat for the Conservatives. The constituency boundaries roughly correspond with the Malvern Hills District.

Members of Parliament

MPs 1832–1885 
Worcestershire West

MPs since 1997

Constituency profile
The constituency boundaries roughly correspond with the Malvern Hills District. The seat is known for its hilly landscape: with products such as regional speciality cheeses, drinks and mineral water, a major economic sector is tourism and leisure. However, the principal industries are in agriculture; food; chemicals; distribution; waste and mineral processing; printing and publishing; and transport and retail.

Workless claimants who were registered jobseekers were in November 2012 significantly lower than the national average of 3.8%, at 2.1% of the population based on a statistical compilation by The Guardian.

Boundaries 

West Worcestershire stretches from the Gloucestershire border in the south almost to Shropshire in the north, taking in Pershore and Bredon Hill in its eastern side.  Its other major towns are Malvern in the west and Upton-upon-Severn in the centre.

Boundary changes for 2010, the fifth modern review nationwide, added an area including Tenbury Wells to the seat (formerly in the Leominster constituency) and lost the small shared part of the Fladbury ward to the Mid Worcestershire seat.

1832–1885: The Petty Sessional Divisions of Upton, Worcester, Hundred House and Kidderminster, and the City and County of the City of Worcester.

1997–2010: The District of Malvern Hills wards of Baldwin, Broadheath, Chase, Hallow, Kempsey, Langland, Laugherne Hill, Leigh and Bransford, Link, Longdon, Martley, Morton, Powick, Priory, Ripple, Temeside, The Hanleys, Trinity, Upton-on-Severn, Wells, West, and Woodbury, and the District of Wychavon wards of Bredon, Eckington, Elmley Castle, Pershore Holy Cross, Pershore St Andrew's, Somerville, and South Bredon Hill.

2010–present: The District of Malvern Hills, and the District of Wychavon wards of Bredon, Eckington, Elmley Castle and Somerville, Pershore, and South Bredon Hill.

History

1832-1885
West Worcestershire formally, the Western division of Worcestershire, was created the first time for the 1832 general election, by the Reform Act 1832 which radically changed the boundaries of many British parliamentary constituencies. It was created by the division of the old Worcestershire constituency (which had existed since 1290) into two new two-member constituencies: West Worcestershire and East Worcestershire.

During this first creation, three members of the Lygon family, the Earls Beauchamp (pronounced Beecham) represented the constituency - their large country estate in the county had its seat at Madresfield Court near the heart of Madresfield village.

The constituency then existed, basically unchanged, until its abolition by the Redistribution of Seats Act 1885 for the 1885 general election, when the constituency's territory was variously incorporated into the seats of Bewdley, Droitwich, Evesham, East Worcestershire and North Worcestershire.

1997–present
The seat was created on Parliament's approval for the 1997 general election of the Boundary Commission's fourth periodic review (following the first such review in 1945, which in turn followed that of the Representation of the People Act 1918.

Political history
In the four elections to date the seat has alternated between Conservative majorities that were quite marginal (7.8% and 5.3%) and those that were greater than 10%, at 12% and 12.7%, close to average in terms of security for any of the three largest parties.  As never having had a majority that exceeded 15% of the vote (in this modern creation) and having had the two marginal majorities to date, the seat cannot be classified as safe. After the 2015 UK general election, this marginal profile between the Conservatives and Liberal Democrats drastically changed after the Liberal Democrats' share of the vote fell markedly, leaving West Worcestershire as a safe Conservative seat since, with the Conservatives easily achieving 50% of the vote share each election. The seat was broadly in line with the UK average in the 2016 referendum on the UK's status with the EU, with an estimated 52 to 53% voting to Leave.

Elections

Elections in the 2010s

Elections in the 2000s

Elections in the 1990s

Elections in the 1880s

Elections in the 1870s

 Caused by Dowdeswell's resignation.

Elections in the 1860s

 Caused by Lygon's succession to the peerage, becoming 6th Earl Beauchamp.

 Caused by Lygon's succession to the peerage, becoming 5th Earl Beauchamp.

Elections in the 1850s

 Caused by Lygon's succession to the peerage, becoming 4th Earl Beauchamp

Elections in the 1840s

Elections in the 1830s

 Caused by Foley's succession to the peerage, becoming 4th Baron Foley

See also 
 List of parliamentary constituencies in Herefordshire and Worcestershire

Notes

References

Sources
Reference: Statutory Instrument 1987 No. 2208 
The Parliamentary Constituencies (England) (Miscellaneous Changes) (No. 3) Order 1987

External links
West Worcestershire Liberal Democrats
Official website of Richard Burt, Liberal Democrat Parliamentary Candidate
West Worcestershire Conservative Association
West Worcestershire Conservative Future
Official website of MP Sir Michael Spicer
Official website of Harriett Baldwin, Parliamentary Candidate

Parliamentary constituencies in Worcestershire
Parliamentary constituencies in Worcestershire (historic)
Constituencies of the Parliament of the United Kingdom established in 1832
Constituencies of the Parliament of the United Kingdom disestablished in 1885
Constituencies of the Parliament of the United Kingdom established in 1997